Hélder Figueiredo Rodrigues (born 6 October 1989) is a Portuguese footballer  who plays for Lusitano FCV as a forward.

External links

Stats and profile at LPFP 

1989 births
Living people
Portuguese footballers
Association football forwards
Liga Portugal 2 players
S.C. Covilhã players
Académico de Viseu F.C. players
C.D. Feirense players
Lusitano FCV players
People from Centro Region, Portugal